The 35th (South Midlands) Signal Regiment was a British Territorial Army regiment of the Royal Corps of Signals.

History
The Regiment was formed at Sparkbrook in 1967. It consisted of five squadrons:

Support Squadron
48 (City of Birmingham) Signal Squadron
58 (Staffordshire) Signal Squadron
89 (Warwickshire) Signal Squadron
95 (Shropshire Yeomanry) Signal Squadron

The regiment's squadrons were all based in the Midlands of England: The Regimental Headquarters and Support Squadron, in Coventry. 48 Signal Squadron in Birmingham; 58 Signal Squadron in Newcastle-under-Lyme; 89 Signal Squadron in Rugby; and 95 Signal Squadron is based in Shrewsbury. The Regiment was supported  by a Royal Electrical and Mechanical Engineers (REME) Light Aid Detachment (LAD). The LAD is responsible for maintaining and repairing the unit's vehicles and equipment, including its fleet of Land Rovers and the L85A2 rifle.

As a result of the strategic review of reserves it was announced on 28 April 2009 that the regiment was to be disbanded.

References

Regiments of the Royal Corps of Signals